Rachel Frances Shaw (born 1981) is an American actress and filmmaker. She is best known for playing Bridgette Bird on the Showtime series SMILF, based on the 2015 short film of the same title, which she wrote, directed and starred in. Shaw is also known for playing Mary Jo Cacciatore on the 2010–2011 Spike TV series Blue Mountain State, and her recurring role as Shayla Nico in the first season of the USA Network television series Mr. Robot.

Early life and education
Shaw was born in South Boston, and also grew up in Brookline, Massachusetts. Her mother, an Irish Catholic from South Boston, raised her Jewish. Shaw's parents divorced when she was four years old. She grew up in a single-mother home with an older half-brother, who owns a bar in Boston.

Shaw attended Michael Driscoll School and Brookline High School. At Michael Driscoll, Shaw played full court streetball at a nearby neighborhood park. Shaw said that basketball was a constant of her childhood, and she incorporated it into the pilot and third episode of SMILF. After receiving a scholarship in her junior year, Shaw transferred to the private school Milton Academy in Milton, Massachusetts, where she graduated in 2000. In 2007, she graduated from Barnard College with a degree in literature.

Career
After college, Shaw decided to move to Los Angeles, but discovered she was pregnant. Much of her struggles to work as an actor while being a single mother are the loose inspiration for SMILF. A role in the 2014 ABC's ensemble series Mixology was a breakout role, providing Shaw with her first sense of financial stability since giving birth to her son.

In 2009, Shaw first received recognition in the completely improvised Katie Aselton-directed film The Freebie and then as the oddball drunken cheerleader Mary Jo Cacciatore in the 2010 sitcom Blue Mountain State.

In 2013, Shaw appeared in the HBO's TV series starring Stephen Merchant called Hello Ladies. She had roles in the 2013 independent film The Pretty One, which starred Zoe Kazan and Jake Johnson, and the 2014 romantic comedy film Someone Marry Barry. Also in 2014, Shaw appeared in another independent feature, the drama Lullaby, which starred Garrett Hedlund and Amy Adams.

In 2015, Shaw had a recurring role on the first season of the television series Mr. Robot as Shayla Nico, the drug dealing love interest of Elliot Alderson, for seven episodes.

In 2015, she appeared in the ABC Family pilot Tough Cookie as well as on the 2015 Fox TV series Mulaney. In 2016, Shaw reprised her role of Mary Jo Cacciatore from the 2010 series in the movie Blue Mountain State: The Rise of Thadland. Also in 2016, Shaw appeared in the Netflix series Flaked. She was a series regular on the 2016 TV series Good Girls Revolt.

Shaw's 2014 short film SMILF, which she wrote, directed and starred in opposite Thomas Middleditch, won the 2015 Short Film Jury Award for U.S. Fiction at Sundance. In 2015, SMILF was picked up by Showtime as a half-hour comedy television show with Shaw as showrunner, writing, directing, starring in, and producing the series. The first season, which was shot on location in South Boston as well as Los Angeles, received generally positive reviews, with her portrayal of single mother Bridgette Bird notable for its realism, insight, and biting humor. "Frankie Shaw, it [SMILF] marks the arrival of an important and original voice." SMILF co-stars Connie Britton and Rosie O'Donnell, and tackles subjects like eating disorders and sexual abuse. Shaw said that the show was a way to discuss and portray the role of women on screen. In November 2017, Showtime renewed SMILF for a second season. In December 2018, it was reported that Shaw and the series had been accused of workplace misconduct. In March 2019, the series was cancelled after two seasons.

In 2016, Shaw returned to the Sundance Film Festival with another short film she wrote and directed, a dark comedy titled Too Legit, which stars Zoë Kravitz, Teresa Palmer, Nate Corddry and Clark Gregg. Too Legit is inspired by a satire of Congressman Todd Akin's controversial 2012 remarks about rape and pregnancy: "It seems to be, first of all, from what I understand from doctors, [rape resulting in pregnancy is] really rare. If it's a legitimate rape, the female body has ways to try to shut the whole thing down."

In 2017, Shaw had a supporting role as Gail Hurley in the feature film Stronger, which was directed by David Gordon Green, and starred Jake Gyllenhaal as 2013 Boston Marathon bombing survivor Jeff Bauman.

In 2019, it was reported that Shaw is attached to direct an adaption of the Katherine Faw Morris novel Ultraluminous, produced by Steven Soderbergh. In 2020, numerous announcements were made regarding projects Shaw is attached to: she is reported to be writer and executive producer of an HBO series adapting the 1978 Judy Blume novel Wifey, and will direct the first episode; she is reportedly to star in Kill Switch, a film to be directed by Soderbergh; and she is attached to direct an adaption of the T Kira Madden novel Long Live the Tribe of Fatherless Girls.

Personal life
In August 2016, Shaw married writer–producer Zach Strauss.

Shaw has a son, Isaac Love, from a prior relationship with director and actor Mark Webber. Shaw and Webber share joint custody of Isaac.

Filmography

Film

Television

Awards and nominations

References

External links

 

1981 births
Living people
21st-century American actresses
Actresses from Boston
American film actresses
American television actresses
Barnard College alumni
Milton Academy alumni
Showrunners
American television directors
Sundance Film Festival award winners
Writers from Brookline, Massachusetts
American women television producers
American women television writers